{{DISPLAYTITLE:C8H8O5}}
The molecular formula C8H8O5 (molar mass: 184.14 g/mol, exact mass: 184.0372 u) may refer to:

 3,4-Dihydroxymandelic acid
 Methyl gallate

Molecular formulas